Gemeindeverband is a union of at least two municipalities in Germany to form a  (statutory corporation) with the purpose to exercise the powers of self-government at a larger scale, while maintaining autonomy of its members.

The word is mentioned multiple times in the German constitution, but without an exact definition.

The States of Germany have slightly different kinds of a :

 (collective municipalities) to allow direct co-operation of municipalities:
 Gemeindeverwaltungsverband in Baden-Württemberg
 Verwaltungsgemeinschaft in Bavaria
 Amt in Brandenburg
 Amt in Mecklenburg-Vorpommern
 Samtgemeinde in Lower Saxony
 Verbandsgemeinde in Rhineland-Palatinate
 Verwaltungsgemeinschaft in Saxony
 Verwaltungsverband in Saxony
 Verbandsgemeinde in Saxony-Anhalt
 Verwaltungsgemeinschaft in Saxony-Anhalt
 Amt in Schleswig-Holstein
 Verwaltungsgemeinschaft in Thuringia

 to allow direct co-operation of districts, commonly summarised as higher municipal association (:
 Bezirk in Bavaria
 Bezirksverband Pfalz in Rhineland-Palatinate
 Landschaftsverband in North Rhine-Westphalia
 Landschaftsverband in Lower Saxony

References

 
Types of administrative division